The Korea Ice Hockey Association is the governing body and member of the International Ice Hockey Federation (IIHF) that oversees ice hockey in South Korea.

XXIII Olympic Winter Games
The Korean Ice Hockey Association will have the opportunity to compete in the Olympics for the first time, under host nation rules, as Pyeongchang, South Korea has been awarded the 2018 Winter Olympics.

References

External links
South Korea at IIHF.com
Korea Ice Hockey Federation Website

Kore
Sports governing bodies in South Korea
Ice hockey in South Korea
International Ice Hockey Federation members